The Urenco Group is a British-German-Dutch nuclear fuel consortium operating several uranium enrichment plants in Germany, the Netherlands, United States, and United Kingdom. It supplies nuclear power stations in about 15 countries, and states that it had a 29% share of the global market for enrichment services in 2011. Urenco uses centrifuge enrichment technology.

Urenco, headquartered in Stoke Poges, England, is owned one third by the UK government, one third by the Dutch government, and the final third equally by two major German utilities, E.ON and RWE.

Group structure

Ownership 
Urenco is owned in three equal parts by Ultra-Centrifuge Nederland NV (owned by the Government of the Netherlands), Uranit GmbH (owned equally by German energy companies E.ON and RWE) and Enrichment Holdings Ltd (owned by the Government of the United Kingdom and managed by UK Government Investments). The company was set up in 1971, pursuant to the Treaty of Almelo (named after the community in the Netherlands where the company originated), which restricts the sale of ownership stakes.

Subsidiaries

Urenco Deutschland, Urenco UK, and Urenco Nederland are 100% subsidiaries of Urenco Enrichment Company. They operate enrichment plants at Gronau, Westphalia, Germany, at Capenhurst, England, and at Almelo, Netherlands.

In the United States, where Urenco is represented by its marketing subsidiary Urenco, Inc., the Urenco USA facility became operational in spring 2010. ETC provides enrichment-plant design services and gas-centrifuge technology for enrichment plants through its subsidiaries in the UK (Capenhurst), Germany (Gronau and Jülich), the Netherlands (Almelo), France (Tricastin) and the U.S. (Eunice, New Mexico).

Decommissioning 
Urenco Netherlands BV has dismantled enrichment plant SP3, after the decommissioning of SP1 and SP2 in the 1980s and 1990s. Information about decommissioning cost calculations for Urenco facilities is not accessible.

Controversies

Abdul Qadeer Khan
In the 1970s, Abdul Qadeer Khan, who worked for a subcontractor of Urenco in Almelo, brought the drawings of the centrifuges operated by Urenco to Pakistan by skipping the Urenco administration and the Dutch government. Those blueprints were stolen from the Urenco administration. In  early 1974, Khan joined the Project-706 uranium enrichment programme, launched by Munir Ahmad Khan under Zulfikar Ali Bhutto, Pakistani Prime Minister at that time. Later, he took over the project, and established a facility that produced highly enriched uranium (HEU). Within a short span of time he established a highly advanced uranium enrichment facility near Islamabad.

Namibia
In May 1985, the United Nations Council for Namibia (UNCN) decided to take legal action against Urenco for breaching UNCN Decree No 1, which prohibited any exploitation of Namibia's natural resources under apartheid South Africa, because Urenco had been importing uranium ore from the Rössing mine in Namibia. The case was expected to be ready by the end of 1985 but was delayed because Urenco argued that, despite having enriched uranium of Namibian origin since 1980, it was impossible to tell where specific consignments came from. When the case finally reached court in July 1986, the Dutch government took Urenco's line, claiming not to have known where the uranium had been mined.

Uranium tails contracts with Russia
According to Greenpeace, Urenco has a contract with Russia for the disposal of radioactive waste. In reality, these contracts do not relate to the disposal of waste, but to the sale of depleted uranium tails, which are re-enriched to natural uranium equivalent. As the enricher, Russia would be the owner of any radioactive waste that results from this process. In March 2009, there were protests about the largest-ever load of depleted uranium hexafluoride being transported from Germany to the Siberian town Seversk.

References

External links

 

Nuclear fuel companies
Nuclear technology companies of Germany
Nuclear technology companies of the United Kingdom
Nuclear technology in the Netherlands
Government-owned companies of the United Kingdom
Government-owned companies of the Netherlands
E.ON
RWE
Companies based in Buckinghamshire
South Bucks District